The European banking crisis of 1931 was a major episode of financial instability that peaked with the collapse of several major banks in Austria and Germany, including Creditanstalt on , Landesbank der Rheinprovinz on , and Danat-Bank on . The crisis has been widely associated with the subsequent rise of the Nazi Party in Germany and its eventual takeover of government in early 1933, as well as the emergence of Austrofascism in Austria and other authoritarian developments in Central Europe. 

The causes of the crisis included a complex mix of financial, fiscal, macroeconomic, political and international imbalances that have nurtured a lively debate of historiography.

Background

Germany's banking sector shrunk dramatically from 1913 to 1924, but expanded rapidly again in the later 1920s, with fivefold growth of aggregate bank assets between 1924 and 1930. The banks were generally undercapitalized and overstretched following rapid balance sheet expansion in the late 1920s, with a predominance of short-term debt, much of it foreign. During 1924-1929, Germany's was the world's largest capital importer, with U.S. banks lending massively to German counterparts and U.S. investors buying German bonds in large volumes. By mid-1928, 42 percent of deposits at joint-stock banks were foreign, and the share was 18 percent of all deposits in the German banking sector in 1929. This unusual feature of the German financial system was a direct legacy of the hyperinflation of 1921-1923, which durably impaired the role of capital markets and made the country abnormally dependent on short-term foreign lending. Many German companies routinely parked their money in foreign subsidiaries that in turn lent to their German parent. Similar patterns could be observed in other Central European countries that had suffered from hyperinflation, particularly Austria, Hungary, and Poland, to a lesser extent Romania, and much less so Czechoslovakia.

The long-standing practice of self-regulation in the German banking sector, with the exception of local savings banks, implied that this increase in leverage was not kept in check by public supervision. Even at the time, self-regulation was not obviously effective to keep risks in check: for example, Deutsche Bank was impacted by a series of scandals related to poor credit risk controls in the mid-1920s. 

There was no simple correlation between bank type and risk profiles; for example, the Landesbank der Rheinprovinz had expanded its lending to municipalities without proper risk management, whereas its peer the  had behaved more prudently.

Harbingers of crisis started to accumulate at the end of the decade. German stock prices started declining with the "Black Friday" of May 1927, and GDP growth slowed substantially in 1928 and turned negative in 1929. Industrial production started to decline from mid-1929. A cyclical credit crunch started in May 1930 and resulted in German money supply, defined as currency and bank deposits, contracting by 17 percent from June 1930 to June 1931. 

German policymakers displayed excessive confidence in market discipline as a sufficient mechanism to ensure the soundness of the banking sector, not least as German banks published balance sheet data on a monthly basis, and also confidentially reported foreign debt data to the Reichsbank. By contrast, the Bank of France only gathered balance sheet information from the largest four commercial banks (Comptoir National d'Escompte de Paris, Crédit Industriel et Commercial, Crédit Lyonnais, and Société Générale) before a supervisory regime was first introduced in 1941. In June 1931, Reichsbank President Hans Luther assured his American counterpart George L. Harrison that "periodical publication of German banks' statement provide safe means for judging their situation which is safe despite large foreign withdrawals." In spite of the apparent abundance of data, however, German public authorities' knowledge about the true state of banks' financial condition was systematically deficient. Conversely, the issue of foreign lending was heavily politicized in Germany and its importance correspondingly overestimated, not least because much of the "foreign capital" invested in Germany was actually round-tripping by German investors e.g. via the Netherlands and Switzerland for tax avoidance.

Incipient financial instability occurred in Spring 1929, due to fictions in the reparations negotiations; July 1930, due to governmental crisis; and September 1930, due to the Nazi Party's strong showing in the Reichstag election. These episodes, however, were kept under control by the Reichsbank.

In France, an early wave of deposit flight occurred from October 1930 to February 1931, during which retail savers transferred their holdings on a large scale from small and mid-sized banks, for which no deposit guarantee existed, to cash, direct deposits at the Banque de France, and accounts at the de facto state-guaranteed savings banks.

In Austria, Creditanstalt was widely viewed as a pillar of financial stability given its history of market dominance and prudent management led by the Rothschild family. Its traditional strength, however, ironically became a vulnerability as the government leaned on it to absorb struggling banks, including Allgemeine Bodencreditanstalt and Union-Bank. Its governance was also disrupted by the emergence of the Bank of England as a major shareholder through the Anglo-International Bank, the former Anglo-Austrian Bank which had sold its Austrian operations to Creditanstalt in 1926 in an all-shares transaction. In 1930 and early 1931, the project of an  generated additional friction, restricting the willingness of Austria's international creditors and especially France to support the country in moments of turmoil.

Crisis

On , Creditanstalt publicly announced that it would not be able to publish a financial statement.. On , the German government announced it would be unable to pay reparations as previously planned, triggering a parliamentary crisis. On , U.S. President Herbert Hoover announced a one-year "holiday" or moratorium on the payment of political debts, known as the Hoover Moratorium, which brought some relief even though it was initially opposed by France. On , the Reichsmark introduced restrictions to its domestic bill discounts, with the aim disincentivizing transfers of money abroad by German firms - but this had catastrophic effect by creating financial squeezes even for essentially sound firms.

From mid-June, concerns arose around a loan of 48 million Reichsmark that Danat-Bank had granted to struggling textile company Nordwolle, corresponding to 40 percent of its equity. On , Danat-Bank ran out of discountable bills. On , the Reichsbank suspended the convertibility of the Reichsmark, effectively taking Germany out of the gold standard, and imposed capital controls. From , some banking transactions were again authorized but with severe limits and restrictions, partly loosened on 20 July. 

Meanwhile, the Reichsbank sponsored several mechanisms to facilitate the revival of interbank transactions. Its capital of 200 million Reichsmark was subscribed (albeit at 25 percent) by the government (40 percent), the Deutsche Golddiskontbank (a Reichsbank subsidiary, 10 percent), Deutsche Bank und Disconto-Gesellschaft (10 percent), Deutsche Zentralgenossenschaftskasse, Bank für Industrie-Obligationen, Deutsche Rentenbank-Kreditanstalt, and Dresdner Bank (6 percent each), and other Berlin-based joint-stock banks (10 percent). The Akzeptbank's early activity was mainly focused on the largest problem banks, namely Danat-Bank, Dresdner Bank, Landesbank der Rheinprovinz as well as Bremen's , and lent to the Deutsche Girozentrale to support the network of savings banks.

The unraveling of the gold standard continued after Germany's exit in mid-July, immediately followed by Hungary. France remained in the gold standard until 1936, with severe deflationary effect. 

Significant banks collapsed in other countries as well. In Hungary, in addition to high foreign indebtedness, several banks had significant exposures to Austrian banks and were thus directly impacted by the Austrian banking turmoil. In France, a new wave of deposit withdrawals from small and mid-sized banks occurred between July 1931 and January 1932, albeit on a slightly smaller scale than the previous one in late 1930,, and triggered the collapse of a significant bank, the Banque Nationale de Crédit which was restructured in early 1932 as the Banque Nationale pour le Commerce et l'Industrie.

"Standstill agreements" were made with major creditor countries in August and September, following a conference in London on 20-23 July. The Hoover moratorium, which aimed to protect longer-term exposures by imposing a standstill on short-term repayments, disproportionately impacted British merchant banks involved in trade finance to German counterparts, but also triggered a collapse in the value of German bonds, many of which had been underwritten by American institutions. 

Political constraints linked to the controversies over war reparations, implying that the "appearance of prosperity" and visible public investment should be avoided, weighed negatively on key economic sectors such as the automobile market and infrastructure works. Economic historian Peter Temin concludes that Brüning "ruined the German economy — and destroyed German democracy — in the effort to show once and for all that Germany could not pay reparations." It remains debated, however, to which extent an alternative strategy of expansion would have been viable. Harold James notes that the legacy of the hyperinflation episode of the early 1920s implied that public borrowing and spending could not be an appropriate strategy for crisis resolution, in Germany as in other Central European Countries including Austria, Hungary, and Poland.

Aftermath and legacy

The financial crisis sharply exacerbated the economic downturn that had started before mid-1931. The German turmoil of July 1931 generated powerful spillover impact on other countries, particularly the United States which were uniquely exposed because of the structuring of German post-WWI reparations. At the Lausanne Conference of August 1932, an agreement was outlined on an indefinite suspension of German reparations, but that was rejected by the U.S. Congress in December 1932, triggering defaults by Germany on reparations and by France and the UK on interallied war debts. Ultimately, losses of U.S. investors into German debt amounted to 13 to 16 percent of U.S. 1931 GDP, and the German debt problem would only be settled in 1953 with the London Agreement on German External Debts.

At its low point in 1932, German economic output had declined 39 percent from its level in 1929. The large joint-stock banks were fully reprivatized in 1937. Capital controls were kept for an extended time period. 

The crisis had major consequences for the development of prudential banking supervision in Germany, which had been essentially nonexistent (except for savings banks) before 1931. Initially the Reichsbank was associated with the supervisory process through a newly established Supervisory Office, but that role was transferred to the Economics Minister  upon a legislative revision in 1939, and the  itself was dissolved in 1944 with its duties taken over by the economics ministry. Another decree on  granted legal personality to the Sparkassen and reinforced their public supervision.

Historiography

The financial crisis of 1931 has long been identified as a major contributor to the global economic depression of the early 1930s. In the early decades following the crisis, it was often described as a somewhat serendipitous crisis of confidence, in which the key mechanism was the withdrawal of short-term foreign deposits or "hot money". Joseph Schumpeter described the crisis as triggered by "vicissitudes [that] would have to be explained primarily in terms of accidents and external factors".

By contrast, historian Harold James has argued in 1984 that a domestic crisis of public finances was at the core of the German sequence, noting that domestic deposit flight predated the exodus of foreign investors in Germany by several critical weeks. Isabel Schnabel in 2004 identified it as twin crises in currency and banking markets respectively, namely a "run on the Reichsmark" and a run on the banks viewed as "two independent causes". Schnabel thus similarly de-emphasized the centrality of foreign-currency aspects, and noted the absence of currency mismatch in large banks' balance sheets despite high shares of foreign deposits. Schnabel also argued that the large Berlin-based universal banks were made to feel too big to fail by the Reichsbank's liquidity policy stance, contributing to moral hazard and uncontrolled balance sheet expansion in a context of increasing competition among banks. In 2014, economists Albrecht Ritschl and Samad Sarferaz found empirical evidence "consistent with the claim of Schnabel (2004) that Germany's 1931 crisis was causally a banking crisis, whereas monetary transmission under the Gold Standard played only a limited role."

The long-accepted causal link between the Creditanstalt collapse and the events in Germany has likewise been questioned in more recent historiography. Separately, recent research has demonstrated that France was not spared by the banking crisis, against a long-established view that the country had been spared. That view was distorted by the lack of accessible data beyond the country's four largest banks which were comparatively unscathed, and could only be corrected with the rediscovery of a unique collection of balance-sheet data of most French banks gathered by Crédit Lyonnais between 1901 and 1939, known as the Album.

See also
 Panic of 1930
 Emergency Banking Act

Notes

Banking crises
Great Depression
1931 in economics
Economic history of Austria
Economic history of Germany
Economy of the Weimar Republic
Gold standard